Hüseyin Pasha may refer to:

 Hüseyin Pasha Boljanić (died 1594/5), Ottoman governor of Bosnia, Damascus (1582–1583), and Egypt (1573–1574)
 Ohrili Hüseyin Pasha (died 1622), Ottoman grand vizier (1621)
 Mere Hüseyin Pasha (died 1624), Ottoman grand vizier (1622, 1623)
 Gazi Hüseyin Pasha (died 1659), Ottoman grand vizier (1656) and Kapudan Pasha (grand admiral)
 Husayn Pasha (died 1663), Ottoman governor of Gaza Sanjak
 Husayn Pasha ibn Makki (d. 1783), Ottoman governor of Damascus Eyalet, Marash Eyalet and Gaza Sanjak
 Mezzo Morto Hüseyin Pasha (died 1701), Ottoman corsair, bey, and Kapudan Pasha (grand admiral) of the Ottoman Navy
 Amcazade Köprülü Hüseyin Pasha (1644–1702), Ottoman grand vizier of the Ottoman Empire (1697–1702)
 Hüseyin Avni Pasha (1820–1876), Ottoman grand vizier (1874–1875)
 Hüseyin Tevfik Pasha (1832–1901), Ottoman military adjutant and author of Linear Algebra (1882, 1892)
 Hüseyin Hilmi Pasha (1855–1922), Ottoman grand vizier (1909)
 Hüseyin Zekai Pasha (1860–1919), Ottoman Turkish painter